The Vincent House is a historic building located in Fort Dodge, Iowa, United States. The distinguishing features of this three-story, red brick, Second Empire house is its mansard roof and wrap-around porch. Web Vincent moved his family into the house in 1879 and it remained in the Vincent family until 1969 when Anne R. Vincent died. Vincent was a businessman who made his fortune in the local gypsum industry. A ballroom was located on the third floor and its walls were composed of gypsum plaster, which was the first time it was used in the United States. The house was listed on the National Register of Historic Places in 1973.

References

Houses completed in 1871
Second Empire architecture in Iowa
Fort Dodge, Iowa
Buildings and structures in Webster County, Iowa
National Register of Historic Places in Webster County, Iowa
Houses on the National Register of Historic Places in Iowa